Uroš Zupan (born 25 August 1963) is a Slovene poet and translator. He has published numerous collections of poetry and his poetry has also been translated into German, Polish, Czech, Slovak, English, Serbian and Croatian.

Zupan was born in Trbovlje in 1963 and lived there until he went to study Comparative literature and Sociology of culture at the University of Ljubljana. He works as a translator from English, Croatian and Serbian into Slovene. He has translated works by Yehuda Amichai and John Ashbery into Slovene. In 1996 he won the Prešeren Foundation Award for his poetry collection Odpiranje delte (Opening the Delta) and in 2000 the Jenko Award for his poetry collection Drevo in vrabec (The Tree and the Sparrow).

Poetry collections
 Copati za hojo po Kitajski (Slippers for Walking Around China), 2008
 Jesensko listje (Autumn Leaves), 2006
 Lokomotive (Locomotives), 2004
 Sutre (Sūtras), 1991, 2002, 2003
 Nafta (Oil), 2002
 Drevo in vrabec (The Tree and the Sparrow), 1999
 Nasledstvo (Succession), 1998
 Odpiranje delte (Opening the Delta), 1995
 Reka (River), 1993

References

Slovenian poets
Slovenian male poets
Slovenian translators
Living people
1963 births
People from Trbovlje
University of Ljubljana alumni